Saneg is a town and commune in Médéa Province, Algeria. According to the 1998 census it had a population of 3,120.

The Roman town of Uzinaza was located in the area.

References

Communes of Médéa Province
Cities in Algeria